The 1955 Tour de Suisse was the 19th edition of the Tour de Suisse cycle race and was held from 11 June to 18 June 1955. The race started and finished in Zürich. The race was won by Hugo Koblet.

General classification

References

1955
1955 in Swiss sport
1955 Challenge Desgrange-Colombo